The Massachusetts Expansion of Bottle Deposits Initiative, Question 2 was an unsuccessful initiative voted on in the Massachusetts general election held on November 4, 2014. It was one of four 2014 ballot measures put to public vote.

Voting
Question 2 on the ballot, "Expanding the Beverage Container Deposit Law".

YES on the question would extend the deposit law to all nonalcoholic, noncarbonated beverages not already included (with some exceptions), as well as raise handling fees. The state would also be required to adjust the deposit amount every five years based on the consumer price index, but this amount could never fall below 5 cents.

A NO VOTE means the law will remain as is.

Source:

References

Further reading

External links
 2014 Ballot Questions at sec.state.ma.us
 Question 2 text via masslive.com

2014 Massachusetts ballot measures
Initiatives in the United States